Sam Gifaldi (born January 12, 1984) is a former American actor, best known for the voice of Sid on Nickelodeon's Hey Arnold!.

Gifaldi, the son of John and Kimberly Gifaldi, was born in Rochester, New York.

Filmography

Awards/Nominations

References

External links

Living people
American male child actors
American male film actors
American male television actors
American male voice actors
1984 births